Kaliště is a municipality and village in Pelhřimov District in the Vysočina Region of the Czech Republic. It has about 400 inhabitants.

Administrative parts

Villages of Háj, Holušice, Podivice and Staré Hutě are administrative parts of Kaliště.

History
The first written mention of Kaliště is from 1318, when it was a property of the Vyšehrad Chapter. During the Hussite Wars, King Sigismund seized the property and in 1436 pledged it to the Trčka of Lípa family. In 1698, it was purchased by the Count Jan Jáchym Harrach, who had built a castle here. He passed it to the Austrian Trautson noble family in 1707. The castle was demolished in 1801.

Notable people
Gustav Mahler (1860–1911), composer

References

External links

Villages in Pelhřimov District